The Hong Kong Act 1985 (c. 15) was an Act of the Parliament of the United Kingdom that made provision for the ratification of the Sino-British Joint Declaration that was signed on 19 December 1984 in Beijing that agreed to end British sovereignty and jurisdiction over the then British dependent territory of Hong Kong to the People's Republic of China after 1 July 1997. It was given royal assent on 4 April 1985.

The Act became spent following the transfer of sovereignty on 1 July 1997.

See also
Treaty of Nanking
Convention of Peking
Convention for the Extension of Hong Kong Territory
Newfoundland Act
Malaysia Act 1963

References

British Hong Kong
Sovereignty
History of Hong Kong
United Kingdom Acts of Parliament 1985